Alexei Igorevich Grishin (Гришин, Алексей Игоревич ; born September 28, 1988) is a Russian professional ice hockey defenceman. He is currently playing with Yuzhny Ural Orsk of the Supreme Hockey League (VHL).

Playing career
Grishin made his Kontinental Hockey League (KHL) debut playing with HC Vityaz during the 2008–09 KHL season.

In the 2014–15 season, Grishin was traded for the second time within a month by SKA Saint Petersburg, along with Evgeny Ryasensky and Mikhail Tikhonov, to Neftekhimik Nizhnekamsk in exchange for Nikolai Belov and a first-round pick on November 24, 2014.

References

External links

1988 births
Living people
HC Khimik Voskresensk players
Metallurg Novokuznetsk players
Russian ice hockey defencemen
Salavat Yulaev Ufa players
SKA Saint Petersburg players
HC Spartak Moscow players
HC Vityaz players